Joel Sobotka (born August 20, 1970) is the former head men's basketball coach for Portland State University and was most recently the head coach of Valley Catholic High School in Beaverton, Oregon.  He also was a former assistant coach at Cal State Northridge and the University of Portland. Prior to Cal State Northridge, he was an assistant coach under Ritchie McKay, and then head coach for four seasons at Portland State University.

Head coaching record

References

External links
 University of Portland Pilots

1970 births
Living people
Arizona State Sun Devils men's basketball coaches
Arizona State University alumni
Cal State Northridge Matadors men's basketball coaches
Eastern Oregon Mountaineers men's basketball coaches
High school basketball coaches in the United States
Portland Pilots men's basketball coaches
Portland State Vikings men's basketball coaches